Kiên Thành may refer to several places in Vietnam, including:

Kiên Thành, Bắc Giang, a rural commune of Lục Ngạn District
, a rural commune of Trấn Yên District

See also
 Kiến Thành (disambiguation)